Qasr (plural qusur), from Latin castrum, may refer to:

Individual qusur and places named after a qasr

Particular types of qusur

Alcázar (cognate Spanish term; also Alcácer or Alcàsser)
Alcazar (disambiguation)
Desert castles, Umayyad qusur, whose names all have the form Qasr XY
Ksar (North African form of the word)